Benoît Caranobe (born 12 June 1980 in Vitry-sur-Seine) is a French former gymnast who won a bronze medal at the 2008 Beijing Olympics. Caranobe was the first Frenchman to medal in the Individual All-Around competition since Marco Torrès won silver and Jean Gounot won bronze in said event at the 1920 Antwerp Olympics.

2004 Athens Olympics 

In his first Olympic appearance, Benoît Caranobe placed 19th in the men's all around competition and helped the French men's team to a 9th-place finish in the team qualification, though not enough to make the team finals.

2008 Beijing Olympics 

Caranobe qualified to the all around finals in tenth place, 2.950 points behind the leader Yang Wei. In the all-around finals, Caranobe finished in third place, ahead of medal favorites Hiroyuki Tomita, Fabian Hambüchen, and Yang Tae-Young. His third-place finish is particularly surprising given that Benoît had placed only third at the French National Gymnastics championships, and his overall score was only 0.050 behind silver medalist, legendary Kohei Uchimura of Japan.

Later life 

Caranobe retired from competition in 2013. He is the owner of a wine shop in Noisy-le-Grand near Paris and also works as an acrobat at the  Moulin Rouge cabaret.

References

External links
 
 
 

1980 births
Living people
People from Vitry-sur-Seine
French male artistic gymnasts
Olympic gymnasts of France
Gymnasts at the 2004 Summer Olympics
Gymnasts at the 2008 Summer Olympics
Olympic bronze medalists for France
Olympic medalists in gymnastics
Medalists at the 2008 Summer Olympics
Mediterranean Games gold medalists for France
Mediterranean Games silver medalists for France
Competitors at the 2009 Mediterranean Games
Sportspeople from Val-de-Marne
Mediterranean Games medalists in gymnastics
Universiade medalists in gymnastics
Universiade gold medalists for France
Medalists at the 2001 Summer Universiade
21st-century French people